is a Japanese former cyclist. He competed in the team pursuit at the 1992 Summer Olympics.

References

External links
 

1971 births
Living people
Japanese male cyclists
Olympic cyclists of Japan
Cyclists at the 1992 Summer Olympics
Sportspeople from Ōita Prefecture
Asian Games medalists in cycling
Asian Games bronze medalists for Japan
Cyclists at the 1994 Asian Games
Medalists at the 1994 Asian Games